AVSnap is a freeware audio/visual system integration and design software that was created by Altinex Inc. in 2004. The software started as a way to create a visual routing diagram of and audio/visual system that is similar to an A/V schematic or a Computer network diagram. The software provides a design environment to create Audio Visual diagrams and layouts.

Functionality

 AV System design – create library symbols, assign snap points property, connect symbols with cable object and generate list of materials and cables.
 AV System layout – create symbols for front or back panels, position them in a rack and connect them with cable. Provide wiring diagram to a technician for rack wiring.
Flow chart the process – switch AVSnap into flow chart mode and develop simple and complex flow charts.
Presentation mode – create a design over multiple pages and then use F5 to switch to presentation mode. All keys work the same way as in PowerPoint.
Communication mode – test all protocols for communicating with equipment using communication mode. Press the telephone icon to transform AVSnap into a Hyperterminal with a twist.  You have two windows: Terminal window and Notepad. Jot down commands and then send them through a COM port or over the network.
Language editor – If you want to use your native language with AVSnap, select language editor and type in all the text displayed. Once done, switch to your own language for simplicity.
GUI design — Set page format to pixels to reveal the GUI design environment. Design buttons, sliders, and video objects. Import PNG files to create the GUI background and press F11 for full development language. Execute created program on a PC or a standalone touch pane.
Web server (License required) – anything you design in AVSnap can be served on the web. Graphics, pages, GUI, or anything else. GUI can be used to control equipment over the web.

Libraries
AVSnap can combine groups of objects into libraries that users can select from to create their diagrams. Users can create their libraries or choose from ones included from other companies, including Simtrol, Calypso Systems, and partner Analog Way.

History

The origins of AVSnap started in 1993 when very few vendors provided software for designing AV systems. Many AV professionals were looking for a development tool that could be used in-house and offer an easy information exchange.

The first attempt to design the AVSnap started in 2001. After a year of experimenting with features, the final draft of the software was released. It took another three years to fine-tune performance and settle on the name.

The AVSnap was released to the market in 2004. The first version of the software was a simple graphic editor that allowed easy AV System design. Eventually, it evolved into the development system it is now.

See also
List of CAD companies
Stardraw
AutoCAD

References

External links
AVSnap homepage
Altinex homepage

2004 software
Computer-aided design software